Guyana–Mexico relations are the diplomatic relations between Guyana and Mexico. Both nations are members of the Association of Caribbean States, Caribbean Community, Community of Latin American and Caribbean States, Organization of American States and the United Nations.

History 
Guyana and Mexico are two American nations with very different historical backgrounds. In May 1966, Guyana obtained independence from the United Kingdom and on 1 March 1973, Guyana and Mexico established diplomatic relations. Since then, diplomatic relations between both countries have been limited to only international cooperation through organizations such as the United Nations and regional multilateral organizations such as the Caribbean Community (CARICOM).

In 1975, Mexican President President Luis Echeverría paid an official visit to Guyana. In 1981, Guyanese President Forbes Burnham paid an official visit to Mexico to attend the North–South Summit hosted by Mexican President José López Portillo. Since the initial visits, there have been a few high-level visits between leaders of both nations.

Initially, Mexico was accredited to Guyana from its embassy in Port of Spain, Trinidad and Tobago. In 2009 Mexico opened its first resident embassy in Georgetown. Since the opening of the embassy, diplomatic relations have strengthened between both nations. In 2013, both nations celebrated 40 years of diplomatic relations. In October 2015, Guyanese Prime Minister Moses Nagamootoo paid an official visit to Mexico.

High-level visits 

High-level visits from Guyana to Mexico

 President Forbes Burnham (1981)
 President Bharrat Jagdeo (2011)
 President Donald Ramotar (2014)
 Prime Minister Moses Nagamootoo (2015)
 President Irfaan Ali (2021)

High-level visits from Mexico to Guyana

 President Luis Echeverría (1975)
 President Felipe Calderón (2007)

Bilateral agreements
In June 1996, Guyana and Mexico signed an Agreement of Scientific and Technical Cooperation.

Trade relations 
In 2018, total two-way trade between both nations amounted to US$68 million. Guyana's main exports to Mexico include: rice, bauxite, rum and crystals. Mexico's main exports to Guyana include: wheat, fertilizer, garbanzo beans, alcohol (beer) and steel. Mexican multinational company Cemex operates in Guyana.

Resident diplomatic missions 
 Guyana is accredited to Mexico from its embassy in Washington, D.C., United States.
 Mexico has an embassy in Georgetown.

References 

Mexico
Bilateral relations of Mexico